Basilichthys microlepidotus is a species of Neotropical silverside endemic to Chile. It s a pelagic freshwater species which occurs from the Huasco River to Valparaiso.

References

Basilichthys
Freshwater fish of Chile
Taxonomy articles created by Polbot
Fish described in 1841
Endemic fauna of Chile